Saint Anne Falls (French: Chute Sainte-Anne) is a waterfall going through Canyon Sainte-Anne, Quebec.

See also
List of waterfalls of Canada

References 

Landforms of Capitale-Nationale
Waterfalls of Quebec
Tourist attractions in Capitale-Nationale
Tiered waterfalls